The 2019–20 season was Real Sociedad's 73rd season (and the 10th consecutive) in La Liga, the top flight of Spanish football. In addition to the domestic league, Real Sociedad participates in this season's edition of the Copa del Rey. The season was slated to cover a period from 1 July 2019 to 30 June 2020. It was extended extraordinarily beyond 30 June due to the COVID-19 pandemic in Spain.

Players

Current squad

Reserve team

Out on loan

Transfers

In

Out

Pre-season and friendlies

Competitions

Overview

La Liga

League table

Results summary

Results by round

Matches
The La Liga schedule was announced on 4 July 2019.

Copa del Rey

Statistics

Squad statistics
''Includes the 2020 Copa del Rey Final, delayed until April 2021 and counted in the 2020–21 season in some resources – the match article has specifics of each player's involvement.

|-
! colspan="14" style="background:#dcdcdc; text-align:center"|Goalkeepers

|-
! colspan="14" style="background:#dcdcdc; text-align:center"|Defenders

|-
! colspan="14" style="background:#dcdcdc; text-align:center"|Midfielders

|-
! colspan="14" style="background:#dcdcdc; text-align:center"|Forwards

|-
! colspan=14 style=background:#dcdcdc; text-align:center|Players who made an appearance this season but left the club (including loaned out)

|-
! colspan=14 style=background:#dcdcdc; text-align:center|Players who joined the club after the end of the regular season(i.e. involved only in the delayed 2020 Copa del Rey Final)

|-
|}

Goalscorers

Clean sheets

Notes

References

External links

Real Sociedad seasons
Real Sociedad